La Union is a census-designated place in Doña Ana County, New Mexico, United States. Its population was 1,106 as of the 2010 census. NM 182 connects the community to NM 28.

Geography

Demographics

Education
La Union Elementary School is administered by Gadsden Independent School District and operates as a public school up to grade 6. The school colors are green and yellow. The school mascot is the lion. "La Union Lions" are the sports team of La Union Elementary School.

Local attractions
La Viña Winery
 La Union Maze 
 Sierra Vista Growers

References

Census-designated places in New Mexico
Census-designated places in Doña Ana County, New Mexico